{{Infobox royalty
| image        = चक्रवती येशवंतराजे होळकर.jpg
| name         = Chakrāvarti Yashwant Rao Holkar
| succession   =  6th Holkar Maharaja of Indore
| caption      = 
| native_lang1 = Marathi
| native_lang1_name1 = महाराजाधिराज 
 यशवंतराव होळकर
| title        = Maharaja (Ruler of Indore) Ali Jah (the Exalted Dignity) Zubdat ul-Umara (Best of the Army) Bahadur ul-Mulk (Brave of the Empire) Farzand-i-Arjmand (Son of the Nobleman) Nusrat Jang (Helper in War)| religion     = Hinduism
| full name    = Sawai Shrimant Maharaja Yashwant Rao Holkar
| coronation   = 6 January 1799
| birth_date   = 3 December 1776
| birth_place  = Wafgaon, Maratha Empire(present-day Maharashtra, India)
| death_date   = 
| death_place  = Bhanpura, Malwa, Maratha Confederacy
| reign        = (as regent. 1799 – 1807) (r. 1807 - 1811)
| successor    = Malhar Rao Holkar III
| spouse       = Ladabai , Krishna Bai Holkar, Tulsabai
| father       = Tukoji Rao Holkar
| mother       = Radhabai Holkar
| issue        = Bhimabai,Malhar Rao  Holkar III.
}}
Yashwant Rao Holkar (c. 1776-1811) also known as Jaswantrao Holkar belonging to the Holkar dynasty of the Maratha Empire was the Maharaja of the Maratha Empire. He was a gifted military leader and educated in accountancy as well as literate in Persian and Marathi and Urdu.

On 6 January 1799, Yashwant Rao Holkar was crowned King, as per Hindu Vedic rites and in May, 1799, he captured Ujjain. He was conferred with regal titles by the Mughal Emperor and the British recognized him as a sovereign king. He started campaigning towards the north to expand his empire in that region. Yashwant Rao rebelled against the policies of the Peshwa Baji Rao II. However he was loyal towards Maratha Ruler of Satara as Holkars were paying tribute towards Satara Chhatrapati.

In May 1802, he marched towards Pune, the seat of the Peshwa. This gave rise to the Battle of Poona in which the Peshwa Baji Rao II was defeated. After the defeat, the Peshwa fled Pune. The Conquest of Pune left Holkar in charge of the administration and he took some constructive steps to rebuild the Maratha Empire.
 
Realising the growing British strength in India, Holkar decided to make a stand against the British. Accompanied by Raghuji Bhonsale and Daulat Scindia, Holkar on 4 June 1803 decided to fight against the British force after their meeting at Bodwad. However, after a conspiracy against him, he decided not to be a part of the Maratha Confederacy. To curb the power of the British, Yashwant Rao Holkar wrote letters to different Indian rulers and welcomed them to unite with him and fight against the British power and expel the East India Company from the Indian subcontinent permanently. But, all his plans and appeal went in vain as all the kings had already signed treaties with the British. Afterwards, Yashwant Rao decided to fight against the British on his own. He defeated the British army, led by Colonel Fawcett, at Kunch, in Bundelkhand and he also attacked the capital Delhi to control over the Mughal Emperor Shah Alam II, who was new restricted monarch by the British like marathas and attacked the army of Colonel Ochterlony and Berne. The Siege of Delhi (1804) lasted for more than a week, but Holkar could not succeed because Mughal Emperor sent army for siege and defend From maratha with Colonel Ochterlony was supported by Lord Lake. Yashwant Rao Holkar was bestowed the title of "Maharajadhiraja Raj Rajeshwar Alija Bahadur" as a token of admiration by Mughal Emperor Shah Alam for his bravery.

Afraid of the possibility of Holkar uniting the Indian Rajas against them, the British decided to make peace with him. Yashwant Rao then proceeded to sign a treaty with the British on 24 December 1805, at Rajghat (then in Punjab, which is now in Delhi). Yashwant Rao was known to be the only king in India whom the British approached to sign a peace treaty on equal terms. The British returned all his territory, and accepted his dominion over Jaipur, Udaipur, Kota, Bundi and also affirmed not to interfere in matters relating to the Holkars. The victorious king reached Indore and started ruling his newly expanded kingdom.

Though Holkar again tried to unite the Maratha Confederacy and appealed to Daulatrao Scindia, but Scindia gave the information about this letter to the local British resident, Marsor. Holkar and Scindia agreed on eleven defensive and offensive strategies on 14 November 1807. To make his plan a success he decided to stay in Bhanpura to form a large army and manufacture cannons. He was successful in his endeavour of keeping the British out of his state and started making preparations to drive the British out of India. He assembled an army of 100,000 soldiers to attack Calcutta. However, he died on 27 October 1811, before he could put these plans into effect.

Throne for struggling
Kashi Rao Holkar was not an able ruler, but Malhar Rao II Holkar had all the qualities of an able ruler and was also a military leader; naturally, the people and the soldiers preferred Malharrao. Malharrao, Vithojirao, and Yashwantrao opposed Kashirao and demanded that Malharrao should be the heir after Tukojirao. Another reason was the courage, leadership, and bravery shown by Malharrao in the Battle of Lakhairi (1793), where the Holkars were defeated by the well-trained modern army of Scindia under the command of Benoît de Boigne. He stood till the last soldier fell in the battlefield, and was wounded and fell unconscious there. Support was growing for Malharrao, and Kashirao felt his authority was in danger—so he sought the help of the Scindia, who were considered jealous of the Holkars, due to the growing prominence and rising power of Holkars in North India. This move angered the people, as, during the siege of the Kumher fort in 1754, Scindias had agreed to sign the treaty with Surajmal Jat even though Malharrao's son Khanderao was killed during the siege.

On 14 September 1797, Daulat Rao Scindia suddenly attacked Malharrao and killed him. He imprisoned Malharrao's pregnant wife, Jijabai, who gave birth to Khande Rao Holkar, and Bhimabai Holkar, daughter of Yashwantrao Holkar. Nana Phadnawis condemned this, and so Peshwa Bajirao II, Scindia, and Sarjarao Ghatke imprisoned him. Yashwantrao Holkar took shelter at Nagpur's Raghoji II Bhonsle. When Scindia learned this, he asked Raghoji II Bhonsle to arrest Yashwantrao Holkar; accordingly, Yashwantrao Holkar was arrested on 20 February 1798. Bhawani Shankar Khatri, who was with Yashwantrao, helped him to escape, and both of them escaped from Nagpur on 6 April 1798.

Rise of Yashwantrao

After these incidents, Yashwantrao Holkar never trusted anybody. Meanwhile, support for Yashwantrao Holkar was growing. Vithojirao Holkar, Fatthesinh Mane, Aamir Khan, Bhawani Shankar Bakshi, Zunzhar Naik, Govardhan Naik, Rana Bhau Sinha, Balaji Kamlakar, Abhay Sinha, Bharmal Dada, Parashar Dada, Govind Pant Ganu, Harmat Sinha, Shamrao Mahadik, Jiwaji Yashwant, Harnath Chela, Vazir Hussain, Shahmat Khan, Gaffur Khan, and Fatteh Khan had joined the army of Yashwantrao Holkar.

The King of Dhar, Anandrao Pawar, requested Yashwantrao Holkar's help in curbing the rebellion of one of his ministers, Rangnath; Holkar successfully helped Anandrao Pawar. In December, 1798, Yashwantrao Holkar defeated the army of Shevelier Duddres and captured Maheshwar. In January, 1799, he was crowned King, as per Hindu Vedic rites. In May, 1799, he captured Ujjain. Vithojirao Holkar declared that he was working for Amrutrao, who was more capable of being the Peshwa than Bajirao II. To grow their empire, Yashwantrao Holkar started a campaign towards the north, whereas Vithojirao started a campaign towards the south. Bajirao II sent Balaji Kunjir and Bapurao Ghokale to arrest Vithojirao Holkar, and in April, 1801, Vithojirao was arrested and taken to Pune. On the advice of Balaji Kunjar, he was sentenced to death under the feet of an elephant. His wife and son Harirao were imprisoned. The well-wishers of the Maratha Confederacy warned the Peshwa not to take such a drastic step, as it would lead to the collapse of the Maratha Confederacy; but Bajirao II Peshwa ignored it. When Maharaja Yashwantrao Holkar learned this, he vowed to take revenge.

Military campaigns
Battle of Ujjain
The Battle of Ujjain took place on 4 July 1801, Maharaja Yashwantrao Holkar attacked Sindhia's capital Ujjain, and after defeating Sindhia's army led by John Hessing, extorted a large sum from its inhabitants, but did not ravage the town.  In this war nearly 3,000 soldiers of Scindia's army were killed. The Holkar's victory was an embarrassing defeat for the Sindhia.

Battle of Poona
In May 1802, Yashwantrao Holkar marched towards Pune. He kept on corresponding with the Peshwa, to whom he put forward the following propositions, which, if agreed to, would put an end to hostilities.

He conquered Sendhwa, Chalisgaon, Dhulia, Malegaon, Parol, Ner, Ahmadnagar, Rahuri, Nashik, Sinnar, Dungargaon, Jamgaon, Pharabagh, Gardond, Pandharpur, Kurkumb, Narayangaon, Baramati, Purandhar, Saswad, Moreshwar, Thalner, and Jejuri. On Sunday, 25 October 1802, on the festival of Diwali, Yashwantrao Holkar defeated the combined armies of Scindia and Peshwa at Hadapsar, near Pune. This Battle of Poona took place at Ghorpadi, Banwadi, and Hadapsar. Yashwantrao Holkar had ordered his army not to attack first and wait until 25 cannonballs were fired from other side; when 25 cannonballs were fired, Yashwantrao Holkar ordered his army to attack. As soon as he won the war, he ordered his army not to harm the civilians of Pune. When the Peshwa learned that he was defeated, fled from Pune via Parvati, Wadgaon, to Sinhagad. Yashwantrao Holkar asked the Peshwa to return to Pune. If Maharaja Yashwantrao Holkar wanted to arrest the Peshwa, he would have arrested him; but he sent food to Peshwa so that he didn't suffer.

On 27 October 1802, Peshwa Bajirao II, along with Chimnaji, Baloji, and Kunjir along with some soldiers of Scindia, went to Raigad and spent one month in Virwadi. He then went to Suwarnadurgh, and on 1 December 1802, went to Bassein via a ship named Harkuriyan. The British offered him enticements to sign the Subsidiary Treaty in return for the throne. After deliberating for over a month, and after threats that his brother would otherwise be recognised as Peshwa, Bajirao II signed the treaty, surrendering his residual sovereignty and allowing the British to put him on the throne at Poona. This treaty was signed on 31 December 1802.

The British also had to check the French influence in India. The British Government feared that if they had not adopted measures for the restoration of the Peshwa's authority, Yashwantrao Holkar would have either attacked the company's territories, or those of their ally the Nizam of Hyderabad. They felt, therefore, the restoration of the Peshwa under the protection of the British power was a measure indispensably requisite for the defence, not only of the territories of their allies, but of their own possessions bordering on the Marhatta dominions in the peninsula of India.

Panse, Purandhare, and some other Maratha Sardars had requested the Peshwa to return to Pune and have a dialogue with the Holkars. Even Chimanaji was against signing a treaty with British. 

Peshwa
The flight of Peshwa left the government of Maratha state in the hands of Yashwantrao Holkar. After conquering Pune, the capital of the Maratha Empire, Maharaja Yashwantrao Holkar took the administration in his hands and appointed his men. He appointed Amrutrao as the Peshwa.Jadunath Sarkar, Fall of the Mughal Empire:1789-1803. pg 179 All except Gaekwar chief of Baroda, who had already accepted British protection by a separate treaty on 29 July 1802, supported the new regime.

He freed Phadnawis, Moroba, Phadke, etc., who were imprisoned by Bajirao II and went to Indore on 13 March 1803.

The British reinstated Bajirao II as the Peshwa at Pune on 13 May 1803, but soon the Peshwa realised that he was only a nominal Peshwa and that British had taken total control.

On 14 August 1803, Amrut Rao signed an agreement with the British. He agreed to abandon all claims over the Peshwa's office and to remain friendly with the British. In return, he would receive an annual pension of ₹ 7 lakhs annually from the company with a jagir in Banda district.

Maratha-British treaties
On 4 June 1803, Raghuji Bhosale, Daulatrao Scindia, and Yashwantrao Holkar met at Bodwad and decided to jointly fight against the British. However, the just demands of Yashwantrao Holkar were not fulfilled, and he was betrayed again. Daulatrao Scindia wrote a letter to Bajirao II and stated that they need not worry about Yashwantrao Holkar, as they only should show that they would fulfill the demands of Yashwantrao Holkar, and once they defeat the British, they will take their revenge against Holkar. However, the letter reached the hands of Amrutrao, and he handed the letter over to General Wellesley; Wellesley immediately sent the letter to Maharaja Yashwantrao Holkar. Yashwantrao Holkar decided not to be a part of Maratha Confederacy.

On 17 December 1803, Raghuji Bhonsale II of Nagpur signed the Treaty of Deogaon with the British after the Battle of Laswari and gave up the province of Cuttack including Balasore. On 30 December 1803, the Scindia signed the Treaty of Surji-Anjangaon with the British after the Battle of Assaye and ceded to the British Ganges-Jumna Doab, the Delhi-Agra region, parts of Bundelkhand, Broach, some districts of Gujarat, fort of Ahmmadnagar. Gaekwad of Baroda had already signed a treaty on 29 July 1802. This was 34-year-old Wellesley's first major success, and one that he always held in the highest estimation, even when compared to his later triumphant career. According to anecdotal evidence, in his retirement years, Wellington considered the Battle of Assaye his finest battle—surpassing even his victory at the Battle of Waterloo. On 20 December 1803, General Wellesley, in one of his letters, stated that it was necessary to curb the rising power of Yashwantrao Holkar as he was brave, courageous, and ambitious.

Yashwantrao's success and anxiety in British camp

Yashwantrao Holkar wrote letters to different kings to unite and fight against the British. He stated, "First Country, and then Religion. We will have to rise above caste, religion, and our states in the interest of our country. You too must wage a war against the British, like me." His appeal fell on deaf ears, as all of them had already signed treaties with the British.In a letter dated 15 February 1806 to Vyankoji Bhosale of Nagpur he states:

On 4 April, Lake forwarded some intercepted correspondence of Holkar, which he was said to have been carrying on with the other Indian chiefs of Hindustan to forge an alliance against the British. Lord Wellesley needed no fresh argument to justify his war against Holkar.

In a letter to General Wellesley he demanded 1. That the right of Holkar to collect the tribute, as old, should be recognized; 2. That the ancestral claims of the Holkar family in the Doab, and the right to one pargana in Bundelkhand, should be recognized; 3. That the country of Haryana, which formerly belonged to Holkar, should be surrendered; and 4. That the country now in Holkar's possession should be guaranteed and stated: "Although unable to oppose your artillery in the field, countries of many hundred miles in extent will be overrun and plundered. British shall not have leisure to breathe for a moment; and calamities will fall on the backs of human beings in continual war by the attacks of my army, which overwhelms like the waves of the sea."

When agents of General Perron visited him with a message, "Jaswantrao pointed to his horse and spear, and directed the men to tell their master that the former at all times afforded him a shade to sleep in, and the latter means of subsistence and that he carried his Kingdom on the saddle of his horse and the dominion of the saddle was still formidable."

In a letter dated 4 March 1804 to Lake, he told, "My country and property are upon the saddle of my horse, and please God, to whatever side the reins of the horses of my brave warriors shall be turned, the whole of the country in that direction shall come into my possession. As you are wise and provident, you will consider the consequences of this affair, and employ yourself in settling the important matters which will be explained by my agents."

Yashwantrao Holkar defeated the British army, led by Colonel Fawcett, at Kunch, in Budhlekand. On 8 June 1804, the Governor-General, in a letter to General Gerard Lake, wrote that the defeat caused a great insult. This would endanger the company rule in India, and hence Yashwantrao Holkar should be defeated as soon as possible.

On 8 July 1804, Yashwantrao Holkar defeated the army of Colonel Manson and Leukan at Mukundare and Kota. Bapuji Scindia surrendered before Yashwantrao Holkar. From June till September 1804, he defeated the British at different battles.
On 8 October 1804, attacked the capital Delhi to control over the Mughal Emperor Shah Alam II, who was new restricted monarch by the British like marathas and attacked the army of Colonel Ochterlony and Berne. The Siege of Delhi (1804) lasted for more than a week, but Holkar could not succeed because Mughal Emperor sent army for siege and defend From maratha with Colonel Ochterlony and supported by Lord Lake. Assessing the situation, he changed the plan, and postponed it. Admiring his bravery, Mughol Emperor Shah Alam gave him the title of "Maharajadhiraja Raj Rajeshwar Alija Bahadur".

Colonel Marey and Wallace captured Indore and Ujjain on 8 July 1804. On 22 August 1804, Wellesley marched against Holkar from Pune , along with Bajirao Peshwa's army. In Mathura Maharaja, Yashwantrao Holkar learned that the British had captured some of his territory; he decided to stay in Mathura and work out a strategy to regain his territory. In a letter dated 11 September 1804 written to Lord Lake, Wellesley said that if Yashwantrao Holkar was not defeated at the earliest, the rest of the Kings of India may unitedly stand against the British.

On 16 November 1804, Yashwantrao Holkar reached Deeg by defeating the army of Major Frazer. After the death of Major Frazer, Manson took the charge of the British army. The Jat King Ranjit Singh of Bharatpur welcomed him and decided to be with Yashwantrao Holkar against the British. In Farrukhabad, Lord Lake was a mute spectator, watching Yashwantrao Holkar proceeding towards Deeg; he didn't dare attack Yashwantrao Holkar. The Governor-General was disappointed by this conduct of Lord Lake, and he wrote to him about his disappointment.

Battle of Bharatpur
Lord Lake attacked Deeg on 13December 1804 whereupon the army of Holkar and Jat successfully resisted and reached Bharatpur. Lord Lake attacked on 3 January 1805, along with General Manson, Colonel Marey, Colonel Don, Colonel Berne, Major General Jones, General Smith, Colonel Jetland, Setan, and others. The subsequent siege of Bharatpur lasted for three months and was compared with the war described in the epic Mahabharata. Many poems on this war were written, praising Maharaja Yashwantrao Holkar.

The British East India Company subsequently declared that they would distribute the captured territory of Holkars amongst its Indian allies. Yashwantrao Holkar had become well known throughout India, due to his bravery, however, Amir Khan (Pindari) and Bhawani Shankar Khatri betrayed him. The British gave the Jagir'' of Tonk to Amir Khan Pindari, and a Mahal and a Jagir in Delhi were given to Bhawani Shankar Khatri. Bhawani Shankar Khatri's Haweli, situated in Delhi, is even today referred to as Namak Haram ki Haweli (Traitors House). Daulatrao Scindia decided to help Holkar, but was prevented from doing so by the ill advice of Kamal Nayan Munshi.

Sir P.E. Roberts states that surprisingly, the Jat King Ranjit Singh signed a treaty with the British on 17April 1805, when they had nearly won the war. Due to this, Yashwantrao Holkar had to leave Bharatpur.

The failure of General Lake to conquer the fort of Bharatpur shattered the myth of invincibility of British arms, and raised the fears about the revival of Maratha Confederacy to counter Wellesley's military designs in India. This came as an anti-climax to Lord Wellesley's 'forward policy'. The British Prime Minister was therefore constrained to retort that "the Marquis had acted most imprudently and illegally, and that he could not be suffered to remain in the government". Thus Wellesley was recalled.

Afterwards during the Sikh-Phulkian Wars, Bharatpur accepted Ranjit Singh's supremacy, although the British annexed the states and signed the Treaty of Lahore with them.

Attempting to unite the Maratha Confederacy and rest of the Indian kings

 Yashwantrao Holkar, Satara Chattrapati, and Chatarsinh met at Sabalgad. It was decided that, united, they would uproot the British from Indian soil. However Daulat Rao Scindia, unlike his predecessor, had become very passive after the Treaty of Surji Anjangaon, he had lost his morale to fight the British and preferred to have friendly relations with them rather than fight a losing war. In September 1805, Holkar reached Ajmer. Maharaja Man Singh of Marwar sent his army to support Holkar, however, this army was intercepted by Scindia and destroyed. This was a sign that Scindia had chosen the British side. Yashwantrao Holkar sent letters to the rest of the kings of India, appealing to them to fight against the British. The King of Jaipur, Bhosale of Nagpur, accepted his appeal but did not give any direct help. When the British learned that Holkar was planning a grand war for independence, they informed Lord Lake to pursue Holkar.

On 25 April 1805, Lord Lake replied to Governor-General Wellesley and stated that he was unable to pursue them and that Holkar felt great pleasure killing the Europeans; Governor-General Wellesley replied that all disputes with Holkar be resolved without any war. The British were worried because of the continuous failure against Holkars. They felt that Yashwantrao Holkar would drive out the East India Company.

Finally, they called back Lord Wellesley and appointed Lord Cornwallis as the Governor-General of India. As soon as he came to India, he wrote to Lord Lake on 19 September 1805 and stated that all the territory of Yashwantrao Holkar be returned and that he was ready to make peace with Holkar. Holkar refused to sign any treaty with the British. George Barlow was appointed as Governor-General, due to the sudden death of Lord Cornwallis. Barlow recognized that the combined strengths of Holkar and Scindia were too great to counter; the British signed a treaty with Daulatrao Scindia through Kamal Nayan Munshi on 23 November 1805, and in this way, Holkar was left alone to fight with the British.

Ranjit Singh of Lahore initially agreed to join Yashwantrao Holkar, but Ranjit Singh's (Lahore, Punjab) letter dated 1 August 1804 addressed to Yashwantrao Holkar was intercepted by the British at Mathura. As soon as the British learned this, they sent Bagh Singh, uncle of Ranjit Singh, to prevent Ranjit Singh from supporting Yashwantrao Holkar. Afterwards Yashwantrao had fled to the Sikh Empire where the British asked Ranjit Singh to arrest him. Ranjit Singh disagreed and stated that Yashwantrao would be allowed into his territory as long as they remain 30 kos away from the Sikh army. After an agreement, Ranjit Singh was informed that Yashwant Rao secretly invited the Afghans to invade India. Yashwantrao was told to leave the Sikh empire for such treachery.

Holkar-British treaty

The British Council told Lord Lake to make peace with Yashwantrao Holkar at any cost, because if they were too late and the other Indian kings accepted the appeal of Yashwantrao Holkar, it might result in a decisive British defeat and a possibility of withdrawal from the Subcontinent.

The British commander halted after crossing the boundary-line of Alexander's conquests and encamped his troops on the banks of the Hyphasis (the Beas) within the reach of the troops of Holkar.
He was the only king in India whom the British approached with an unconditional peace treaty as per the London policy of withdrawal. It was not a Treaty of Subsidiary alliance that the British had entered with other Indian states. Maharaja Yashwantrao Holkar saw that the rest of the kings were not ready to unite in a common cause and were only interested in personal benefits that they would incur with the British. He would be the last to sign a treaty with the British, on 24 December 1805 at a place called Rajpur Ghat on the bank of Beas River. The treaty was named 'The Treaty of Peace and Amity between the British Government and Yashwantrao Holkar.' The British recognised him as a sovereign king and returned all his territories and possessions, and accepted his dominion over Jaipur, Udaypur, Kota, Bundi, and some Rajput kings. They also accepted that they would not interfere in the matters relating to Holkars. The treaty was duly ratified by the Governor-General George Barlow in Council on 6 January 1806 and later duly amended on 2 Feb 1806 on the banks of river Ganga in Rajghat. Thus his demands were fulfilled and he successfully resolved the disputes with Shinde, Peshwa and the British. Returning in triumph, the king reached Indore and declared that he had successfully saved his ancestral State.

Lord Lake denounced the abandonment of Indian allies by the company, resigned his post in protest, and returned to England.

In a letter dated 14 March 1806 addressed to Mr. Sherer, Charles Metcalfe, 1st Baron Metcalfe, who witnessed the treaty, states, "But why do I constantly harp upon the character of our Government? I believe it is because I am compelled to feel that we are disgraced; and that Holkar is the prevailing power in Hindostan." Mr. Metcalfe many years later looking back admitted that the measures adopted by Sir George Barlow were necessitated and it was hardly possible to have followed any other course.

Aftermath

In a letter dated 15 February 1806 to Vyankoji Bhosale of Nagpur Yashwantrao states, 

Yashwantrao Holkar again tried to unite the Maratha Confederacy and wrote to Daulatrao Scindia about this. However, Scindia gave the information about this letter to British resident Marsor, who appraised the Governor-General about this on 12 May 1806. Holkars and Scindias agreed on 11 points on defensive and offensive strategies on 14 November 1807; however, the British once again succeeded in preventing the establishment of a Scindia- Holkar alliance.

Finally, Yashwantrao Holkar decided to fight with the British singlehandedly and drive them out of India. He decided to stay in Bhanpura to gather a large army and manufacture cannons to defeat the British. He was successful in keeping the British out of his state, but he wanted them out of India. He knew that this was impossible without sufficient cannons, so he built a factory to manufacture cannons in Bhanpura. He worked day and night and manufactured 200 short and long-range cannons. He gathered an army of 1 lakh soldiers to attack Calcutta. The stress of the work and the deaths of his nephew Khanderao Holkar on 22 February 1807 at Shahapura and Kashirao Holkar in 1808 at Bijagad lead to a stroke, from which he suddenly died at Bhanpura (Mandsaur, M.P.) on 27 October 1811 (Kartiki Ekadashi) at the age of 35 years. The most probable cause of his death is due to excessive blood pressure and stress.

His battles were the significant in the history of Indian wars and the title given to him by the Mughal Emperor gave him a prominent position amongst the rulers of India.

Legacy

He was a gifted organizer and he was skilled in arts of warfare. The various branches of the army were organized on the sound military basis. As a military strategist he ranks among the foremost generals who have ever trod on Indian soil. His heroic achievements shed a noble luster on his military genius, political sagacity, and indefatigable industry. He was one of the greatest and most romantic figures on the stage of Indian history.

See also
 Second Anglo-Maratha War
 Maratha Empire
 Battle of Farrukhabad
 Holkar

References

Books
(Adv Vijaykumar N Dudhbhate)
Zhunj (झुंज) By N.S. Inamdar
Maharaja Yashwant Rao Holkar By Sanjay Sonawani
Shrimanr Maharaj Yashwant Rao Holkar : Maratheshahiakhercha Adwitiya Swatantryaveer]] By Narahar Raghunath Phatak
Waqai-Holkar By Mohan Singh, English Translation:- Sir Jadunath Sarkar, Edited By:- Raghubir Sinh.*(                                                            Hindustani yeshwantacha iteehas by principal madhukar salgare .Marathi edition 2017
Maharaja Yashwant Rao Holkar : Bhartiya Swatantra Ke Mahanayak By Ghanshyam Holkar (PhD)

External links
Yashwantrao Holkar The Great Glory of India एक ऐसा शासक, जिसके सामने अंग्रेजों ने हरबार टेक दिए घुटने

1776 births
1811 deaths
Maharajas of Indore
People of the Second Anglo-Maratha War
Indian military leaders